"Passion" is a 1982 single by the Flirts, a New York-based female vocal trio. Bobby Orlando wrote and produced the song.

Charts 
"Passion" was the trio's only hit in the Netherlands.

"Passion" / "Calling All Boys"

References

External links 
 

1982 songs
1982 singles
The Flirts songs
Songs written by Bobby Orlando
Song recordings produced by Bobby Orlando